The Ranchita Rocks Music Festival was a three-day annual music festival held at the Golightly Farms Ranch in Ranchita, California. The 2008 event had six stages, featuring classic and contemporary rock performances. as well as comedy acts, camping, crafts vendors, a kids' zone, healing arts, food, beer & wine, drum circles, and a fire breathing fire truck with aerial performers.

History
The three-day music festival, which debuted in 2007 as a fund-raising concert for community and environmental groups opposed to San Diego Gas & Electric's proposed Sunrise Powerlink electrical transmission line, returned 2008 with several national headlining acts and an emphasis on solar, biodiesel and wind energy to power the event.

In 2008, the music festival was planned to benefit the Protect Our Communities Fund (POC). POC was working together with Ranchita Rocks Festival to host an all green music and camping festival in the San Diego backcountry. The mission is to fight the proposed high power line route scheduled to run from safe, clean, renewable energy projects in Imperial Valley through Anza Borrego State Park, the largest State Park in the Nation. The festival is raising funds to fight this power line as well as highlight and educate on alternative energy choices.

“We strongly believe that energy does not have to be imported over dangerous high voltage transmission lines and that renewable energy should be produced locally, for local consumption,” states Carolyn Morrow who hosts the event on her  ranch.

In 2007 and 2008 fans complained and bands were not paid. No funds were given to the non-profit opposing this renewable energy transmission project. The festival did not achieve its goal, and as of early 2011 the power line was being built between Lake Henshaw & Santa Ysabel.

Lineup of musical performers by year
Headliners for each date listed in bold text.

2008
The 2008 line-up is available on the official Ranchita Rocks website.

September 12
Mountain featuring Leslie West and Corky Laing,  Pangea Collective, Mojow & VA, Beth Preston, Piano Extravaganza, Interstate Blues, Dopegirl, Wooden Leg, Castner's Duo, Izabella, Cubensis, Shark Attack, Delta Nove, Dull Science, Off Track, OB3, Grand Canyon, Still Time, Funky A, Chris Rollers, LA 5, Mike Delux, Red Rox, 4 Min til Midnight, The Naked Sun, Chi Club, Obscure Relevance, Linda Sublett, DJ Smitty, Zicron & Wish, DJ Atom Matter, Techno Hillbillies

September 13
Particle, Bassnectar, Gram Rabbit, Al Howard, K-23, Still Time, Outpost, Stolen Rose, Teflon, 4 Min Til Midnight, Pangea Collective, Chi Club, Radius, Izabella, Vegitation, Melvin Seals, PUJA, Obscure, Chris Rollers, Glenn Smith, Haywire, Compass Rose, Blackbirdz, Linda Sublett, Nikki O'Neill, Dull Science, Mind World, O.T.I., Beth Preson with guitarist Dale Hauskins, Jay Constable (Jay and The Constables), ON THE ONE, Mike Delux, OB3, LA 5, MoJow & VA, Zicron & Wish, Dopegirl

September 14
Yonder Mountain String Band, Tom Rreund, Nate LaPointe Band, Left Hand Monkey, Compass Rose, MoJow & VA, Beth Preston with guitarist Dale Hauskins, Outpost, The Frequency, Techno Hillbillies, The Troubleweeds, Wooden Leg, Haywire, The Naked Sun, Blackbirdz, Cheap Thrills, Delta Nove, Off Track, O.T.I., Destructo Bunny, Linda Sublett

See also
List of electronic music festivals

References

External links
Ranchita Rocks Music Festival Official website
Entertainment Guide: Ranchita Rocks
Beach California: San Diego Events

Music festivals in California
Rock festivals in the United States
Music festivals established in 2007